The 2013–14 South Carolina State Bulldogs basketball team represented South Carolina State University during the 2013–14 NCAA Division I men's basketball season. The Bulldogs, led by interim year head coach Murray Garvin, played their home games at the SHM Memorial Center and were members of the Mid-Eastern Athletic Conference. They finished the season 9–21, 5–11 in MEAC play to finish in a five way tie for eighth place. They lost in the first round of the MEAC tournament to Savannah State.

Roster

Schedule

|-
!colspan=9 style="background:#960018; color:#00008B;"| Exhibition

|-
!colspan=9 style="background:#960018; color:#00008B;"| Regular season

|-
!colspan=9 style="background:#960018; color:#00008B;"| 2014 MEAC tournament

References

South Carolina State Bulldogs basketball seasons
South Carolina State